The 1966 Davidson Wildcats football team represented Davidson College as a member of the Southern Conference (SoCon) during the 1966 NCAA University Division football season. Led by second-year head coach Homer Smith, the Wildcats compiled an overall record of 4–5 with a mark of 2–3 in conference play, placing fifth in the SoCon.

Schedule

References

Davidson
Davidson Wildcats football seasons
Davidson Wildcats football